Alameddine is an Arabic surname. Notable people with the surname include:

Hachem Alameddine, a Lebanese politician and MP in the 2009–17 Lebanese Parliament
Rabih Alameddine (born 1959), Lebanese-American painter and writer
Ross Alameddine, a victim of 2007 Virginia Tech shooting
Alameddine dynasty, a Yaman Druze clan from Lebanon and Syria that at some time held Emir status during the Ottoman empire.